The Singapore Weiqi Association (Chinese: 新加坡围棋协会 Pinyin:Xīnjiāpō Wéiqí Xiéhuì) is a Go association in Singapore. Founded in 1981, it aims to promote the game of Go in Singapore and improve the skills of local Go players. To achieve its objective, professional players from China are hired to conduct lessons, and tournaments are regularly organized. Amateur players in Singapore can have their rank assessed by the association; it awards rank diplomas up to 6 dan. For international exposure and networking, the association sends players to participate in international competitions such as World Amateur Go Championship and World Youth Go Championship. Currently, the association has two clubhouses: the main clubhouse in Bishan and the city clubhouse in Bugis.

The current chairman is Kwa Kim Chiong (Chinese:柯金章 Pinyin:Ke Jin Zhang). The association was founded in 1981, then activities took place at the Ulu Pandan Community Center. For a number of years, the Singapore Weiqi Association received support from the Ing Foundation.

The Singapore Weiqi Association has successfully hosted several inter-country tournaments and organized visits from many Go professionals from China, Japan and Korea. Recently, it hosted the Asian qualifying tournament for the Toyota/Denso Oza Championship. It also organized the Singapore, Malaysia, Thailand Weiqi Friendship Tournament in 2006. In 1989 and 1999, the World Youth Go Championship was also hosted in Singapore, which was notable at that period of time. Domestically, the Association also organizes a number of local tournaments and competitions. It sends about 5 to 10 representatives to overseas tournaments each year.

A key activity of the Association is to provide Go training to the public. Today, it trains more than 3,000 students yearly at its clubhouses and at various schools. It also supports Go training classes at about 20 local schools and institutions.

See also 

 International Go Federation
 List of professional Go tournaments
 Zhongguo Qiyuan
 Taiwan Chi Yuan
 Hong Kong Go Association

References

External links
 
 Singapore Weiqi Association Facebook Page

Go organizations
Go
1981 establishments in Singapore
Sports organizations established in 1981